In the Polynesian mythology of the Tongan island of ʻAta, the god Tamapoulialamafoa is the king of the heavens. He is the one who ordered (through his servants all called Tangaloa (Tangaloa Eiki, Tangaloa Tufunga, and Tangaloa Atulongolongo)) the sub-god Laufakanaa to become ruler of that island.

According to others, however, Tangaloa Eiki was the ancestor god and Tangaloa Tamapoulialamafoa, Tangaloa Eitumātupua, Tangaloa Atulongolongo, and Tangaloa Tufunga his offspring.

Notes

References
O. Māhina, Ko e Ngaahi Ata mei he Histōlia mo e Kalatua o Tongá: Ke Tufungai ha Lea Tonga Fakaako, AU 2006, 

Tongan deities